Pericaliella is a genus of moths in the subfamily Arctiinae that is known from the Afrotropics. It includes one species Pericaliella melanodisca (Hampson, 1907) from Cameroon, Zaire, Uganda and Rwanda.

References 
 , 2006: New genera and species of Arctiinae from the Afrotropical fauna (Lepidoptera: Arctiidae). Nachrichten des entomologische Vereins Apollo 27 (3): 139–152.
 , 1995: The Afrotropical Tiger-Moths. An illustrated catalogue, with generic diagnosis and species distribution, of the Afrotropical Arctiinae (Lepidoptera: Arctiidae). – Stenstrup, Denmark: Apollo Books Aps., 55 pp.

Arctiinae
Monotypic moth genera
Moths of Africa